The 1975 Rugby League World Championship (also referred to as the World Series) was the seventh tournament for the Rugby League World Cup. The format differed from that employed in previous competitions; no single country hosted the matches, which were spread out in a 'world series' hosted by each of the five participating nations over a period of just over eight months. Each team had to play the others on a 'home and away' basis. Great Britain were split up into separate England and Wales teams, taking advantage of a glut of Welsh talent in the British game at the time.

No final was held, with Australia being deemed the champions by virtue of finishing on top of the table with England coming in second.

Teams

Venues 
14 venues across the five competing countries hosted games of the 1975 Rugby League World Cup. Wales used their own home venue at Swansea, but also played home games in England in both Salford and Warrington. England also played a 'home' game against Wales at Lang Park in Brisbane, Australia.

Results 

In this match Mick Cronin kicked nine goals.

England winger Keith Fielding created a new record by scoring four tries against a hapless French team at Bordeaux.

Kangaroo wing prodigy Ian Schubert also scored a hat-trick tries.

English stand-off Ken Gill ran in three tries.

In this match Jim Mills, the Wales prop, was banned for the rest of the season after an altercation. The ban was eventually lifted on 2 January 1976.

Final standings

Final challenge match 
As Australia had not beaten England to win the cup, a final challenge was hastily arranged. The Kangaroos showed they were worthy World Champions with a comprehensive 25–0 win at Headingley in front of a disappointing crowd of 7,680 which was over 11,000 less than had attended the 1970 World Cup Final between Great Britain and Australia at the same venue.

Try scorers 
7

  Ian Schubert
  Keith Fielding

5

  Mick Cronin

4

  Bob Fulton
  Ken Gill
  John Holmes
  Bill Francis

3

  Mark Harris
  Graeme Langlands
  John Peard
  Terry Randall
  Ged Dunn
  Eric Hughes
  Bob Jarvis
  Phillip Orchard

2

  Ray Higgs
  John Lang
  Lew Platz
  Tommy Raudonikis
  Steve Rogers
  Patrick Chauvet
  George Fairbairn
  Tony Gordon
  Ken Stirling
  Dennis Williams
  Peter Banner
  John Bevan
  David Willicombe

1

  Ray Branighan
  Graham Eadie
  Tim Pickup
  John Quayle
  Johnny Rhodes
  John Atkinson
  Colin Forsyth
  Jeff Grayshon
  Brian Hogan
  Thomas Martyn
  Roger Millward
  Mick Morgan
  Steve Norton
  Stuart Wright
  Bernard Curt
  René Terrats
  Tony Coll
  Tom Conroy
  Murray Eade
  John Greengrass
  Lyndsay Proctor
  John Smith
  John Whittaker
  Kel Coslett
  Tony Fisher
  Brian Gregory
  John Mantle
  Jim Mills
  Clive Sullivan
  David Treasure
  Frank Wilson

References

External links 
 1975 World Cup at rlhalloffame.org.uk
 1975 World Cup at rlwc2008.com
 1975 World Cup at rugbyleagueproject.com
 1975 World Cup data at hunterlink.net.au